Luis de Córdoba, born Luis Pérez Cardoso in Posadas on May 15, 1950, is a Spanish flamenco singer. He won 2 national awards in the National Contest of Flamenco Art in Córdoba in 1974 and 1977 and numerous others. In 1980 and in 1986 he participated in the Bienal de Sevilla . In 1994 he was featured on a compilation CD entitled Duende:From Traditional Masters to Gypsy Rock alongside fellow singers Camaron de la Isla, Enrique Morente, and top guitarists such as Paco de Lucia, Sabicas, Ramon Montoya and Tomatito. In December 2007 he was honored by the University of Cordoba with the St. Thomas Aquinas Award, and in June 2009, took the position as head of flamenco at the university. He is the author of the book El Flamenco: Tradición y Libertad (Flamenco: Tradition and Freedom) (2001).

References
this article includes a partly translated text from the GFDL licensed Cordabapedia article in Spanish

External links
Cordabapedia article 

Spanish male singers
Flamenco singers
1950 births
Living people
People from Córdoba, Spain
People from the Province of Córdoba (Spain)